YMCK is a Japanese chiptune band, composed of Midori Kurihara (vocals), Takeshi Yokemura (music, lyrics, arrangement), and Tomoyuki Nakamura (composition, music video).

Their work has not been confined to Japan, having released albums in Korea, Thailand and the United States as well as appearing at various events around East Asia and Europe.

YMCK's name is derived from the CMYK subtractive color model.

History
YMCK was formed in May 2003 when Kurihara joined Yokemura and Nakamura. They soon released their first work; a CD-R containing 6 tracks.

In 2004, YMCK appeared at Microdisko in Stockholm, Sweden. In the same year they released their first full album, Family Music.

In 2005, YMCK again appeared outside Japan, this time at the Formoz Festival in Taipei, Taiwan and at the Fat Festival in Bangkok, Thailand. This year also marks the first release of the Magical 8bit Plug, a synthesizer developed by Yokemura himself, motivated by frustration with the quality of game sounds available in the synthesizers used for Family Music. Now making use of the Magical 8bit Plug, they released their second album: Family Racing.

In 2006, they again appeared at the Formoz Festival in Taiwan.

In 2008, YMCK  released their third album Family Genesis, now under pop label Avex Trax, made available for the first time on the iTunes Store in the United States. Later that year and under the same label, they would release their first cover album, the YMCK Songbook, a collection of covers of Japanese music from the era before the NES.

In January 2009, they appeared in Sweden once again, this time at UppCon in Uppsala, and also played in the opening ceremonies for Katsucon 15 in Arlington, Virginia (DC). In that same month they also released Family Cooking. In 2009, YMCK also remixed the No. 1 hit song Days by Japanese mega-star Ayumi Hamasaki.

During 2013, YMCK released Family Days, this time through not records. The theme of this album was said to be YMCK describing their own ordinary lives.

In 2015, they released Family Dancing.

In 2017, Family Swing was released, and for the first time they also released through Bandcamp, under U.K. chiptune label Hyperwave.

Discography

Note: The English is not necessarily a direct translation of the Japanese. The English titles are taken from the English version of the website. For example, track one on "FAMILY RACING" was actually titled "FAMILY RACING" instead of "Opening" on the Japanese release.

Studio albums

FAMILY MUSIC (CD-R edition) (2003, self-released)
 Opening
 Pastel Colored Candy [パステル・キャンディーは悪魔のささやき]
 Darling
 Pow * Pow
 Does John Coltrane Dream of a Merry-go-round? [ジョン・コルトレーンは回転木馬の夢を見るか]
 Yellow, Magenta, Cyan and Black (Theme of YMCK) [Yellow, Magenta, Cyan and Black (YMCKのテーマ)]

Family Music (2004, Usagi-Chang (Japan)/Pastel (South Korea)/Records of the Damned (United States))
 Fanfare [ファンファーレ]
 Magical 8bit Tour
 Pastel Colored Candy [パステル・キャンディーは悪魔のささやき]
 Darling
 POW * POW
 Interlude
 SOCOPOGOGO (YMCK Version)
 Synchronicity
 Tetrominon -From Russia with Blocks-
 Does John Coltrane Dream of a Merry-go-round? [ジョン・コルトレーンは回転木馬の夢を見るか]
 Yellow, Magenta, Cyan and Black (Theme from YMCK) [Yellow, Magenta, Cyan and Black (YMCKのテーマ)]
 Your Quest is Over

Family Racing (2005, Usagi-Chang (Japan)/Pastel (South Korea)/smallroom (Thailand)
 Opening [ファミリーレーシング]
 Panic Racer 005 [パニックレーサー005]
 Go YMCK, Go!
 Come on! Swing all stars. [カモン！スウィングオールスターズ]
 Rock'n Roll rendezvous feat. Takahashi Meijin [ロッケンロール･ランデブー featuring 高橋名人]
 Sakana no Mabataki [魚のまばたき]
 Milky Blue -Riddle In Wonderland- [Milky Blue ～不思議の国のリドル～]
 Kira * Kira [キラ＊キラ]

Family Genesis (2008, avex Group (Japan)/Records of the Damned (United States))
 Prologue [プロローグ]
 Sabita Tobira no Dai 8 Tengoku [錆びた扉の第8天国]
 Pleiades [プレアデス]
 Starlight
 Izukata no Fue [何方（いずかた）の笛]
 Carving the Rock
 Future Invasion [フューチャー・インヴェージョン]
 Rain
 System Reboot [システム・リブート]
 Floor 99
 Major Swing
 8 Ban me no Niji [8番目の虹]
 Jidai Okure no Sora [時代遅れの空]
 Finale ~Welcome to the 8-bit World~ [フィナーレ ～Welcome to the 8bit world～]

YMCK SONGBOOK: songs before 8bit (2008, avex Group (Japan) - Covers album; original artists listed in parentheses)
 Yume no Naka e (Inoue Yosui)
 Bokutachi no Shippai (Morita Doji)
 Ningen Nante (Yoshida Takuro)
 Kasa ga Nai (Inoue Yosui)
 Shunkashuto (Izumiya Shigeru)
 Manzoku Dekirukana (Endo Kenji)
 Kotoba ni Dekinai (Oda Kazumasa)
 Jinsei o Katarazu (Yoshida Takuro)
 Marude Shojikimono no Yoni (Tomobe Masato)

Family Cooking (2009, Avex Group (Japan))
 Omocha no Heitai no March [おもちゃの兵隊のマーチ]
 Curry da yo! [カレーだよ！]
 Sarada Shabadaba [サラダ・シャバダバ]
 Mitsuboshi Chef no Uta [三ツ星シェフの歌]
 Gourmet na Aitsu [グルメなアイツ]
 Fuwafuwa Tamago no Omu Rice [ふわふわ卵のオムライス]
 Kaerimichi, Bangohan [帰り道、晩ご飯]
 Wonderful Chocolate [ワン！ダブル・チョコレート]
 Ban Ban Cooking [バンバンクッキング]

Family Days (2013, not records (Japan))
Yozora Ha Machino
Sakaraigataki Unmei No Naka
Mirai No Natsumero (feat. P.O.P ORCHeSTRA)
Dot No Hibi
Neko Ni Kakomarete Kurashitai
Sasetsushite Usetsushite
Mata Aruki Dasu Tameni

Family Dancing (2015, not records (Japan))
Los Colors de la Vida
Neo Identity
Disko Kitsch
Time Bomb
Perfect Device
52 Futures
Unity
You Can Be a Star

Family Swing (2017, not records (Japan))
National Anthem of Retrojuego
Glory in my hands (Theme song of YMCK the phantom thieves)
Emerald tact
Great mission Yeah-yeah
Teatime
Thrill me (Theme song of the swingers the phantom thieves)
Melancholic swingers
Slapstick car chase
Random parade
A world waits for me
Annoying swingers	
Sound of music

PiCTOBiTS
YMCK composed the music for the DSiWare downloadable puzzle game PiCTOBiTS, which features 8-bit music from Nintendo games.

References

External links
Official Website
Myspace Website
Interview with Deathrockstar (2007)
YMCK biography at Jaapan
Hyperwave records' Bandcamp

Japanese electropop groups
Musical groups established in 2003
Avex Group artists